MetroLink is a light rail transit system serving the Greater St. Louis area in the United States. The 46-mile system is operated by Metro Transit which is an enterprise of the Bi-State Development Agency. With an average weekday ridership of 56,900 in 2014, MetroLink is the twelfth-busiest light rail system in the United States.

The system currently has 38 stations; 13 are served only by the Red Line, nine only by the Blue Line, and the other 16 by both lines. Thirteen stations are located in the City of St. Louis, Missouri; 14 in St. Louis County, Missouri; and 11 in St. Clair County, Illinois. Central West End is the busiest station by daily ridership, Sunnen the least busy.

MetroLink began service on July 31, 1993, on the Red Line segment between the North Hanley and 5th & Missouri stations. An infill station at East Riverfront and an extension to Lambert–St. Louis International Airport opened in 1994 (Terminal 1), followed by a second station at the airport in 1998 (Terminal 2). Since then, the system has had two major expansions. The first expansion, the St. Clair County Extension, extended the Red Line to the College station in Belleville, Illinois, in 2001 and to Scott Air Force Base (Shiloh-Scott) two years later. The second major expansion, the Cross County Extension, was completed in 2006, adding the Blue Line branch between the Forest Park–DeBaliviere and Shrewsbury–Lansdowne I-44 stations via Clayton, Missouri.  An additional infill station, Cortex, opened in 2018, next to the Cortex Innovation Community.



Stations

References

External links 

 

Stations
 
MetroLink (St. Louis) infrastructure
St. Louis MetroLink
St. Louis MetroLink
St. Louis MetroLink
St. Louis MetroLink
MetroLink stations
St. Louis